Raymond or Ray Burton may refer to:
Raymond Burton (rugby league), English rugby league player
Ray Burton (musician) (born 1945), Australian musician
Raymond S. Burton (1939–2013), American politician, known as Ray